The Serbian Progressive Party in Macedonia (SNSM) (СНСМ) is a political party in North Macedonia.

Ideology

SNSM shares a variety of contacts with Serbian and other non-governmental organizations in the Republic of Macedonia, Serbia, Montenegro, Republika Srpska and elsewhere and with the core party, Serbia-centered Serbian Progressive Party (SNS). It is a separate and independent political organization, subject to the Constitution and legislation of the Republic of Macedonia.

SNSM (commonly referred colloquially only by the acronym "СНС" - "SNS") also puts strong premium on specifics of both chronic and acute problems of re-establishing and fortification of Serbdom (individual consciousness of oneself as an ethnic Serb, in community of other Serbs). The main principle of SNSM is Serbian identity politics and national empowerment as a hitherto marginalized ethnic group in Republic of Macedonia. It aims to preserve local Serbian heritage and tradition, emphasizing the multi-ethnic character of the country, advancement of organizational and materialized forms of aid to revival of Serbian academic studies, sustaining of the Serbian language and Serbian literacy, and improving the representation of Serbian pupils in Macedonia's schooling system.

The party also rejects anti-Slavic identity revisionism in Macedonia. The practical issues of economic, infrastructural and technical problems facing Serbian community in Macedonia.

It shares its platform with the same-named, previously established political party centered in the Republic of Serbia, and the core of elaborated principles (Serbian conservatism, individualism, minarchism, as the primary principle as opposed to collectivist nationalism of any variety). SNSM seldom calls for state-level libertarian economic reform.

SNSM is distanced from relationships with VMRO-DPMNE, the ruling populist Christian democratic party that promotes Macedonian nationalism.

History

It participated in the election for the unicameral Macedonian Parliament in 2008, but failed to gain any of the 120 seats. However, it has a number of elected local deputies and carriers of public offices on municipal level, in Kumanovo and the region of Skopska Crna Gora.

The party's popular support and enlisted membership comes mostly from the northern part of the country, primarily Kumanovo, city of Skopje with emphasis on Skopska Crna Gora region and to a lesser extent in the towns of Tetovo, Veles, and Poreč area.

At the extraordinary election for Parliament on June 5, 2011, the President of SNSM, Dragiša Miletić, was elected as a Parliamentary Deputy, as a candidate of his party within the block of parties whose most prominent political partner is SDSM.

During the first congress of SNSM held in the town of Kumanovo at 9 March 2014, delegates choose Vane Veličković for the new president of the party. Dragiša Miletić states that he considers Kumanovo congress illegitimate, while being elected as SNSM leader by a separate party congress, held in Banjanje, Skopska Crna Gora.

Dragiša Miletić joined the political coalition for premature parliamentary election in Republic of Macedonia (April, 2014) with the GROM party run by Mayor of Skopje municipality of Karpoš, Stevčo Jakimovski, and with Slobodan Ugrinovski's party Union of Tito's Left Forces as well with the Party of Free Democrats, led by Kiro Geštakovski.

See also 
 Democratic Party of Serbs in Macedonia

References

External links

„Радикалите го почитуваат интегритетот на Македонија“; "Radicals respect the integrity of Macedonia", 2006, (in Macedonian)
Собрание на Република Македонија - Избори 2008; "Parliament of Republic of Macedonia - Elections 2008", (in Macedonian)
"Славица Ђукић Дејановић са Србима у Македонији"; "Slavica Đukić-Dejanović With Serbs in Macedonia"(in Serbian)
СРПСКА НАПРЕДНА СТРАНКА У РЕПУБЛИЦИ МАКЕДОНИЈИ (СНСМ) "Serbian Progressive Party in Macedonia (SNSM)" (in Serbian)
U opštini Staro Nagoričane srpski u zvaničnoj upotrebi; "Serbian language became official in the Municipality of Staro Nagoričane" (in Serbian)
Четири партии се приклучија кон опозициониот блок на СДСМ; "Four Parties Joined the Oppositional Block of SDSM" (in Macedonian)
Odluka lokalnih vlasti u Kumanovu: i srpski jezik u službenoj upotrebi; "Decision by the Local Government in Kumanovo: Serbian language also in official use" (in Serbian)
Декларација Скупштине дијаспоре и Срба у региону - саопштење усвојено на сабору у Београду; "Declaration of the Assembly of Diaspora and Serbs in the region - announcement accepted by the gathering in Belgrade", 05-VII-2010 (in Serbian) 

Serbs of North Macedonia
Political parties established in 2006
Serb political parties in North Macedonia
Conservative parties in North Macedonia
2006 establishments in the Republic of Macedonia